La Padania was an Italian daily newspaper, and the official press organ of the political party Lega Nord.

History and profile
La Padania was the official newspaper of Northern League of Umberto Bossi founded in 1997 by Davide Caparini and directed by Gianluca Marchi (both coming from 'L'Indipendente' of Vittorio Feltri and Daniele Vimercati). It was delivered daily to newsstands and homes in Northern Italy since 8 January 1997. The paper was the official organ of the right-wing party Lega Nord.

The 2009 circulation of La Padania was 60,000 copies.

Due to financial difficulties, publication of the daily newspaper was suspended on 1 December 2014.

References

External links

1997 establishments in Italy
Italian-language newspapers
Lega Nord
Newspapers published in Milan
Padanian nationalism
Newspapers established in 1997
Daily newspapers published in Italy